Lahore is an unincorporated community in Orange County, Virginia, United States, which was named after the historical city of Lahore Pakistan. It is in the Eastern Standard time zone.

The village was named in the 1800s by the owner of a general store, after reading and studying a book about the Subcontinent.

Purchase of lands

Noor Naghmi, son of Pakistani broadcaster Abul Hasan Naghmi, brought the American Lahore to the news in 2007. The junior Naghmi is a financial services professional in Vienna, Virginia. After a years-long negotiation with farmer Nancy Wallace, who owned  of American Lahore (including the center of the town), Naghmi was able to strike a deal for 3 million dollars.

Noor Naghmi's plan
Naghmi told the Washington Post in 2007 that his 3 million dollar deal will turn Lahore, Virginia into a regional tourist attraction for South Asians and others.  His plans include a banquet hall fashioned after his hometown's famous Shalimar Gardens. He also envisions a library and a museum dedicated to the histories of both Lahores. He wants to open a bed-and-breakfast place to serve chickpea curry alongside eggs and toast. He wants to organize Basant with all its fanfare and pomp in the American Lahore.

As of 2021 the property has not been sold to Noor or anyone else. The owner has died and the estate has not yet been settled.

References

Unincorporated communities in Orange County, Virginia